The Rail & Maritime Transport Union (RMTU) is a trade union in New Zealand. It represents transport workers in all aspects of the transport industry; rail, road and ports.

The RMTU is affiliated with the New Zealand Council of Trade Unions, the International Transport Workers' Federation, the International Centre of Labour Solidarity (ICLS) and the New Zealand Labour Party.

External links
 RMTU official site.

New Zealand Council of Trade Unions
International Transport Workers' Federation
Trade unions in New Zealand
Transport trade unions in New Zealand